
Gmina Żychlin is an urban-rural gmina (administrative district) in Kutno County, Łódź Voivodeship, in central Poland.

Villages
Apart from the town of Żychlin, Gmina Żychlin contains the villages and settlements of Aleksandrów, Aleksandrówka, Balików, Biała, Brzeziny, Budzyń, Buszków Dolny, Buszkówek, Chochołów, Czesławów, Dobrzelin, Drzewoszki Małe, Drzewoszki Wielkie, Gajew, Grabie, Grabów, Grzybów Dolny, Grzybów Hornowski, Jankówek, Kaczkowizna, Kruki, Kurów, Marianka, Orątki Dolne, Orątki Górne, Pasieka, Sędki, Śleszyn, Śleszynek, Sokołówek, Szczytów, Tretki, Wola Popowa, Żabików, Zagroby, Zarębów and Zgoda.

Neighbouring gminas
Gmina Żychlin is bordered by the gminas of Bedlno, Kiernozia, Oporów, Pacyna and Zduny.

References
Polish official population figures 2006

Zychlin
Kutno County